Greilyz Greimal Villaroel Hernandez (born 24 June 1996) is a Venezuelan Paralympic athlete who competes in international elite track and field competitions in sprinting events. She is a double Parapan American Games silver medalist and a World bronze medalist.

References

1996 births
Living people
Sportspeople from Maracaibo
Venezuelan female sprinters
Paralympic athletes of Venezuela
Athletes (track and field) at the 2016 Summer Paralympics
Athletes (track and field) at the 2020 Summer Paralympics
Medalists at the 2015 Parapan American Games
Medalists at the 2019 Parapan American Games
Medalists at the World Para Athletics Championships
21st-century Venezuelan women